Paramystrothrips is a genus of thrips in the family Phlaeothripidae.

Species
 Paramystrothrips leclanti
 Paramystrothrips moundi
 Paramystrothrips ophthalmus
 Paramystrothrips orientalis

References

Phlaeothripidae
Thrips
Thrips genera